Tetrobi Managed Reserve is a protected area in Akhalkalaki Municipality on Javakheti plateau in Samtskhe-Javakheti region of Georgia. It protects land in valley of Chobareti river on the Chobareti mountain range at volcanic plateau of Tetrobi.

Its pine forest (Pinus kochiana) and native plants are under protection.

References 

Managed reserves of Georgia (country)
Protected areas established in 1995
Geography of Samtskhe–Javakheti
Tourist attractions in Samtskhe–Javakheti